The 2014 Women's South American Volleyball Club Championship was the sixth official edition of the women's volleyball tournament, played by eight teams from 5 – 9 February 2014 in Sao Paulo, Brazil.

SESI São Paulo won the 2014 edition qualifying for the 2014 Club World Championship, defeating in the finale hosts Molico/Osasco.

Competing clubs
Teams were seeded in two pools of four according to how the representatives of their countries finished in the 2013 edition.

(*)Both Peru and Chile played the tournament with their U23 national teams, Perú played under the name of LNSV, their national volleyball league and Chile played under the name ADO (Asociación de Deportistas Olímpicos, Spanish for Olympic Athletes Association). Both due to a controversial change in the date of the tournament.

First round

Pool A

|}

|}

Pool B

|}

|}

Final round

Bracket

Final standing

All-Star team

Most Valuable Player
 Fabiana Claudino (SESI SP)
Best Opposite
 Ivna Marra (SESI SP)
Best Outside Hitters
 Dayse Figueiredo (SESI SP)
 Ángela Leyva (LNSV Club)

Best Setter
 Dani Lins (SESI SP)
Best Middle Blockers
 Adenizia da Silva (Molico/Osasco)
 Thaisa Menezes (Molico/Osasco)
Best Libero
 Suelen Pinto (SESI SP)

Controversy
Due to the FIVB's decision to host the 2014 Club World Championship in May 2014 instead of October as the past editions, the CSV changed the date of the South American Club Championship to February, a month where the South American volleyball leagues have not yet declared a champion to participate in the tournament. Most of the countries decided to prepare a qualifier, such as the Brazilian Women's Volleyball Superliga which qualified SESI-SP to the tournament while other countries like Perú decided to send a national team under the name of their national volleyball league.

As the official Spanish name for the tournament is "South American Champion Clubs Championship, most countries raised severe opinions about the top three countries from last years edition not participating with a champion club.

References

South American Volleyball Club Championship
2014 in Brazilian sport
2014
International volleyball competitions hosted by Brazil